All the Day Long is a 1959 novel by the British writer Howard Spring. As with many of his works, it is set in Cornwall and Manchester during the Victorian era.

References

Bibliography
 George Watson & Ian R. Willison. The New Cambridge Bibliography of English Literature, Volume 4. CUP, 1972.

1959 British novels
Novels by Howard Spring
Novels set in Cornwall
William Collins, Sons books
Novels set in Manchester